Kaino Thomsen-Fuataga (born 12 May 1991) is a Samoan sportsman who has represented his country in taekwondo and rugby union. He competed in the +80 kg event at the 2012 Summer Olympics; he was defeated by Anthony Obame in the preliminary round and was eliminated by Robelis Despaigne in the repechage contest.

Rugby union

In December 2012, just four months after London 2012, Thomsen announced he had quit taekwondo due to false promises, empty words and the lack of money. He said he wanted to re-purpose his talents at rugby union after representing Manu Samoa in age grade rugby. In February 2013, he was part of the Samoa A squad in the Pacific Rugby Cup, in which Samoa A came runners up to Fiji Warriors. Just two years after London 2012, Thomsen was then named in the Samoan national rugby union team for their 2014 mid-year tests and 2014 IRB Pacific Nations Cup.

In a return to taekwondo for the Pacific Games held in Apia in 2019, Thomsen won a silver medal in a closely contested bout against Australia's Alan Salek in the +87 kg division. He had won a gold medal at the games eight years earlier in Nouméa.

References

External links
 
Kaino Thomsen-Fuataga profile at BBC Sport

1991 births
Living people
Samoan male taekwondo practitioners
Olympic taekwondo practitioners of Samoa
Taekwondo practitioners at the 2012 Summer Olympics
People from Faga'alu